White Wash is a 2011 American documentary film about black surfers, directed, produced, and written by Ted Woods. It documents the struggles of an African Americans being in a predominantly "white sport".

Reception
The film gained positive reviews from critics.

References

External links
Official site
 

2011 films
2010s biographical films
2011 documentary films
2010s historical films
American sports documentary films
American historical films
American independent films
Documentary films about surfing
Documentary films about African Americans
American surfing films
2010s English-language films
2010s American films
2011 independent films